George Louis McLean (September 1, 1893 – March 26, 1951) was an American professional golfer that competed from the 1910s to the 1930s.

McLean was born in Yonkers, New York. Like most golfers of his era, he worked primarily as a club pro while occasionally competing in PGA Tour events. He served at several clubs in New York state: Dunwoodie Golf Course in Yonkers, Great Neck Golf Club in Great Neck, Grassy Sprain Golf Club in Bronxville, and Seneca Falls Country Club in Seneca Falls.

McLean's  best finishes at the PGA Championship were ties for third place (semi-finalist) in 1919, 1920, and 1923 while making six overall appearances. His best finish at the U.S. Open was a tie for fifth in 1919 while making eight cuts overall.

McLean died in an auto accident in 1951.

PGA Tour wins (2)
1923 Westchester Open, Shawnee Open

References

American male golfers
PGA Tour golfers
Golfers from New York (state)
Sportspeople from Yonkers, New York
1893 births
1951 deaths